The 2010 FIFA Club World Cup took place in Abu Dhabi, United Arab Emirates, from 8 December to 18 December 2010. The final 23-man squads had to be submitted by 29 November, with all members of the final squad taken from the provisional list. All players were required to be registered with squad numbers between 1 and 23, unless they were registered for their domestic league with a different number. In the event of an injury to one of the players on the final list, that player may be replaced with a player from the provisional list no less than 24 hours before his team's first match in the competition.

Al Wahda

coach:  Josef Hickersberger

Hekari United

Manager:  Jerry Allen

Internacional

Manager:   Celso Roth

Internazionale

Manager:  Rafael Benítez

Pachuca

Manager:  Pablo Marini

Seongnam Ilhwa Chunma

Manager:  Shin Tae-Yong

TP Mazembe

Manager:  Lamine N'Diaye

References

External links
2010 FIFA Club World Cup Teams at FIFA.com
FIFA Club World Cup UAE 2010 Provisional List of Players
FIFA Club World Cup UAE 2010 Official List of Players

FIFA Club World Cup squads
Squads